Blachford may refer to:

Cecil Blachford (1880–1965), Canadian professional ice hockey forward
Rogers baronets, of Wisdome in the County of Devon (also known as the Blachford baronets)
Frederic Rogers, 1st Baron Blachford (1811–1889), British civil servant
Karen Blachford (born 1966), Canadian wheelchair curler, 2006 Paralympics champion
Mary Tighe (née Blackford or Blanchford: 1772–1810), Anglo-Irish poet.
Blachford Lake, a remote lake in Northern Canada, near Yellowknife
County of Blachford, a cadastral division in South Australia

See also
Blatchford (disambiguation)